Chilkur Balaji Temple, popularly known as "Visa Balaji Temple'', is an ancient Hindu temple of Lord Balaji on the banks of Osman Sagar in Rangareddy District in Telangana. It is one of the oldest temples in Hyderabad Dist earlier now in Rangareddy Dist. built during the time of Madanna and Akkanna, the uncles of Bhakta Ramadas.

This temple has no hundi and neither accepts any money from devotees. VAK Books also known as the Voice of  Temples with religious news is available here. This is one of the special Temples in India with no green channel or privileges for VIP's. The only other such temple is the Jalaram temple in Virpur (Rajkot), Gujarat. This temple fought and won the right to stay out of government control. The only another such temple is "Ramanuj Kot", a temple in Jodhpur, Rajasthan.

Circumambulations
During a visit the devotee goes through the usual rituals of prayer, including 11 circumambulations of the inner shrine, and makes a vow. Once the wish is fulfilled devotees then walk 108 times around the sanctum sanctorum. The majority of wishes by devotees are visa related, thus Chilkur Balaji is also referred to as 'Visa' Balaji. The 11 circumambulations represent the secret of creation — 11 means "1 soul and 1 body" — uniting both with devotion and full determination to fulfill wish, dedicate on the lord; there is no second, everything is god. In the 108 circumambulations, 1 represents the Existence, Almighty, God (Paramathma, Balaji in the minds of the devotee), 0 represents Creation (Illusionary World, Jagath) and 8 represents the time Human Body takes to come to this universe-8 months (Jivatma).

References

External links
 Official site
 Chilukur Balaji Temple 
 Chilkur Balaji Temple Timings
 Chilkur Balaji Temple Information

 

14th-century establishments 
14th-century establishments in India 
14th-century Hindu temples 
Hindu temples in Hyderabad, India 
Hindu pilgrimage sites in India 
Buildings and structures in Hyderabad, India 
Vishnu temples
Vaishnavism
Visa policy of the United States
Visa policy of the United Kingdom 
Visa policies in Europe 
Tourist attractions in Hyderabad, India